Mount Wilson is a peak in the San Gabriel Mountains, located within the San Gabriel Mountains National Monument and Angeles National Forest in Los Angeles County, California. With only minor topographical prominence the peak is not naturally noticeable from a distance, although it is easily identifiable due to the large number of antennas near its summit. It is a subsidiary peak of nearby San Gabriel Peak.

The newer CHARA Array, run by Georgia State University, is also sited there and does important interferometric stellar research.

While not the tallest peak in its vicinity, it is high enough in elevation that snow can sometimes interrupt astronomical activities on the mountain. All of the mountains south of the summit are far shorter leading to unobstructed views across the Los Angeles Basin, Orange County, the Inland Empire, and out to Ventura County, San Diego County and the Pacific Ocean.

Mount Wilson is also heavily utilized for relay broadcasting of radio and television for the Greater Los Angeles Area.

Climate

History 

The native inhabitants of the San Gabriels probably belonged to various tribes of the Tongva people who lived in the low-lying valleys. Granite outcroppings along the Angeles Crest show signs of meal preparations with metate pots ground into rock surfaces.

The first recorded exploration of the mountain was performed by Benjamin Davis Wilson, also known as "Don Benito". Wilson, who was the grandfather of George S. Patton, was the owner of Rancho San Pascual in about 1852 and ran a winery at his home, "Lake Vineyard", which was in the area of today's San Marino. Wilson hoped to find a suitable wood for his casks but was disappointed by the poor quality of trees on the mountain. He built a trail, following an established Indian route, which became known as the Mount Wilson Trail. In turn, Wilson's trail became the predecessor of the Mount Wilson Toll Road. He was surprised to find line shacks at the summit, probably left by Spaniards who were known to track down destructive grizzly bears. He built a three-room cabin along the trail called "Halfway House." Despite Wilson's inability to find adequate wood, the hike became a popular pastime for locals who would make a weekend trip to the summit. These hikers built signal fires on the summit to let people below know that the party had arrived safely.

Astronomy 

In 1889, Professor William Pickering of Harvard University, along with telescope-maker Alvan Clark, prepared an experiment with  telescopes at Mount Wilson. University students would operate the telescopes for nighttime viewing, but more often than not they would log in "bad weather, no visibility" and head to town to relieve their boredom. The small observatory was abandoned with plans to build a larger one at a later date.

In 1891, Thaddeus S. C. Lowe incorporated the Pasadena & Mount Wilson Railroad with the plan of building a scenic mountain railroad to the summit of Mt. Wilson. At the same time, land and easement disputes between camp owners Steils and Strain were going on over the public and private use of the Mount Wilson Trail. The courts ruled that the trail was a public thoroughfare and that any blockading would be illegal. At the foot of the mountain, a local contractor Thomas Banbury built a  roadway to be named "The New Mount Wilson Trail," now the Mount Wilson Toll Road. Passage fare was 25¢ round trip for hikers and 50¢ for horseback.

In 1892, Charles William Eliot, president of Harvard University, planned to have two  lenses shipped from Alvan Clark & Sons in Corning, New York to the newly named Mount Harvard, directly adjacent to Mt. Wilson. The money was to be put up by Edward Falles Spence of the University of Southern California. Walter Raymond, of Raymond & Whitcomb Travel Agency, Boston, and owner of the Raymond Hotel, Pasadena, offered to pay for rail from New York. Lowe offered to take the lenses up via his yet-to-be-built Mt. Wilson Railway. Spence died suddenly and left no word of the money for the project. The lenses ended up at Yerkes Observatory in Wisconsin, and Lowe's railway ended up going to Oak Mountain (Mount Lowe).

In 1903, George Ellery Hale visited Mt. Wilson and was impressed by the perfect conditions for which to set up the observatory, which would become the Mount Wilson Solar Observatory in 1904. In 1905,  were leased for 99 years by the Carnegie Institution for Science in order to construct telescopes, and construction began on a new Mt. Wilson Hotel. In 1908, a  telescope was completed at the summit, and, in 1910, the  Solar Tower was erected. In 1913, the hotel burned down and was replaced by a second hotel that lasted until its demolition in 1966. The Toll Road opened to automobiles in 1912 and lasted until 1936.

In 1917, the  Hooker Telescope was completed and saw first light and would be the world's largest telescope until the opening of the  Hale Telescope at Palomar Observatory in 1948.

In 1919, American astronomer Edwin Hubble arrived at Mt. Wilson and, throughout the 1920s, made many astronomical discoveries using the Hooker Telescope.  Among his contributions are the observational proof that many nebulous objects are actually galaxies beyond our own Milky Way galaxy, the classification of galaxies according to the Hubble sequence, and the development of Hubble's law relating a galaxy's observed red shift to its distance away.  These contributions led to an understanding that the universe is not static, but expanding.  This concept is the basis of the Big Bang theory of cosmology.

Mount Wilson Electronics Reservation 

The first television antenna on Mount Wilson was erected in 1947 for pioneer station KTLA channel 5. At about the same time, the first FM station broadcast from Mount Wilson, which was the old KFI-FM on 105.9 FM (signed off in 1950). The mountain became so popular as a site for transmitters that, in 1963, the Metromedia company bought  from the Mount Wilson Hotel Company. Metromedia built Skyline Park, which consisted of a pavilion, a children's zoo and landscaped walks. The park closed in 1976 after operating at a loss for almost a decade. The property is now the home of numerous transmitters serving the Los Angeles metropolitan area and includes radio, television and microwave relay facilities.

Stations on Mount Wilson

Television 
The following television stations transmit from Mount Wilson:

 Most of the stations in the Los Angeles DMA not listed in the above table transmit from Mt. Harvard, an adjacent peak. These stations are (listed by virtual channel followed by physical channel): KSCI channel 18/18 (ShopHQ), KWHY channel 22/4 (Spanish Ind.), KHTV-CD channel 6/22 (MeTV+), KVMD channel 31/23 (New Tang Dynasty Television), KVEA channel 52/25 (Telemundo), KRCA channel 62/7 (Estrella TV), KBEH channel 63/4 (Canal de la Fe), KILM channel 64/24 (Bounce TV), and KZNO-LD channel 12/6 (Spanish Religious).

Radio 
The FM broadcasters are KPCC-FM 89.3, KPFK-FM 90.7, KUSC-FM 91.5, KRRL-FM 92.3, KCBS-FM 93.1, KLLI-FM 93.9, KTWV 94.7, KLOS-FM 95.5, KNX-FM 97.1, KKLA-FM 99.5, KKLQ-FM 100.3, KRTH-FM 101.1, KSCA-FM 101.9, KIIS-FM 102.7, KOST-FM 103.5, KBIG-FM 104.3, KKGO-FM 105.1, KPWR-FM 105.9, and KLVE-FM 107.5.

Observatory salvaged 
In 1984, the Carnegie Institution for Science began the process of shutting down the observatories on Mount Wilson, opting to concentrate on newer sites in Chile. In 1986, the Mt. Wilson Institute was formed and plans to reopen the observatories were made so that by 2000 all the telescopes were back in operation.

Construction began in 1996 for six 1-meter telescopes by the Center for High Angular Resolution Astronomy at Georgia State University. This was the largest optical interferometric array at the time. Ground was broken for the telescopes in 1999 and the facility became operational in 2001.

See also 
 
 Palomar Observatory
 Sierra Madre, California—at the base of Mt. Wilson, with a trailhead to the peak.

References

External links and sources 

 List of Mount Wilson broadcasters
 Photos from Mount Wilson
 Webcam at Mount Wilson Observatory
 Hikers
 
 CHARA Array
 Image of a slope on Mount Wilson, California, 1920-1939. Los Angeles Times Photographic Archive (Collection 1429). UCLA Library Special Collections, Charles E. Young Research Library, University of California, Los Angeles.

Mount Wilson
Mountains of Los Angeles County, California
Mount Wilson
Mount Wilson
Mountains of Southern California